The 2018 K3 League Basic was the second season of the K3 League Basic. Eleven teams competed in this league for 22 rounds. Each team played in 20 rounds, because the number of teams in this league was odd. Yeoju-Sejong FC and Chungju Citizen newly joined the league in 2018.

Competition format
The 2018 season runs from March through to October. The 11 teams compete in a single division. Each team plays each other home and away for a total of 20 games. After the regular season, the top two team will be directly promoted to 2019 K3 League Advance. In addition, the playoffs between 3rd to 5th team will be held, and its winner and 10th team from 2018 K3 League Advanced will have relegation/promotion playoff for another spot in 2019 K3 League Advanced.

Clubs

Matches 1–20

League table

Playoffs

Before the play-offs, Busan FC withdrew from the league. With Cheongju FC and Cheongju City merging in the league above, Chungju and Yangju played off for the remaining place in 2019 K3 League Advanced.

See also
 2018 Korean FA Cup
 2018 K League 1
 2018 K League 2
 2018 Korea National League
 2018 K3 League Advanced

References

2018 in South Korean football
K3 League (2007–2019) seasons
fifth level football leagues in Asia